Gentleman cambrioleur is the fifth studio album by Canadian singer Garou, and his sixth album overall. This is Garou's first cover album, covering songs from artists such as Jacques Dutronc. The title refers to fictional character Arsene Lupin, who was often referred as Gentleman Cambrioleur (Gentleman Thief in French).

Track listing
"Gentleman cambrioleur" — 2:28 (Yves Dessca, Jean-Pierre Bourtayre, Alain Boublil)
"I Love Paris" — 2:33 (Cole Porter)
"Les dessous chics" — 2:36 (Serge Gainsbourg)
"Sorry" — 3:33 (Madonna, Stuart Price)
"New Year's Day" — 4:04 (U2)
"Les Champs-Élysées" — 3:27 (Pierre Delanoë, Mike Deighan, Michael Wilshaw)
"Da Ya Think I'm Sexy?" — 3:50 (Carmine Appice, Duane Hitchings, Rod Stewart )
"Aimer d'amour" — 3:17 (George Thurston, Léo Sayer, Albert Hammond)
"C'est comme ça" — 3:35 (Fred Chichin, Catherine Ringer)
"Je veux tout" — 2:50 (Ariane Moffatt)
"A ma fille" — 3:50 (Charles Aznavour)
"The Sound of Silence" — 4:31 (Paul Simon)
"Everybody Knows" — 5:58 (Leonard Cohen, Sharon Robinson)

Charts

Weekly charts

Year-end charts

References

2009 albums
Garou (singer) albums
Covers albums
Sony Music France albums